The women's sprint competition in orienteering at the 2017 World Games took place on 25 July 2017 in the City Center of Wrocław, Poland.

Competition format
A total of 40 athletes entered the competition. Every athlete has to check 21 control points, which are located across the course.

Schedule
All times are local (UTC+2).

Results

References 

 
2017 World Games